The Kharvi, are a community found in Goa and Maharashtra. Some are Christians, while others are Hindus. They have various sub-groups, among which are the Taris, Tarukars, and Ramponkars. Taris are the primary fishermen, Tarukars are the Taru owning landlords, etc. Though they are largely involved in fisheries, hence they have right of sacred thread. They are distinct from the Gabit community found mostly in northern Goa and the Pagi community found mostly in southern Goa, although they share a similar traditional occupation. Those who are not engaged in fishing always wear the sacred thread, whereas the fishermen wear it for seven days from the Srāvana Hunnami, or full-moon day of the month Srāvana (August–September), and then remove it. Most follow the Shaiva Shakta tradition, whereas some follow the Smarta tradition.

Found chiefly in the coastal talukas of Mormugao, Salcete and Tiswadi, the Catholic Kharvis generally speak the Konkani language but some use Portuguese. They write Konkani using Roman script. Arranged marriages are common but not prevalent, and monogamy is practised. The traditional joint family arrangements are increasingly giving way to the nuclear family. Their principal diet is rice and fish curry but meat and vegetables are also important constituents.

While the Kharvis are traditionally a significant group among the fishing community of Goa, many of the younger generation have moved away from that occupation and also from the area. They are increasingly to be found working in Europe and the Gulf countries. The traditional modes of fishing in Goa have increasingly been supplanted by mechanised methods and the investment required for this, plus the gains to be accrued, have led to an influx of non-Kharvi communities to the industry. This shift to mechanisation has been encouraged by both the national Government of India and the state Government of Goa since the 1970s, and it had first become evident after the annexation of Goa by India in 1961.
".

As of the 1996, the Kharvi in Goa were designated as an Other Backward Class in the central list maintained by the National Commission for Backward Classes (NCBC). At that time their representation said that they prefer to be known as Kshatriya Marathas but the NCBC listed them as "Koli, Kharvi (including Christian Kharvi)".

References 
Notes

Citations

Hinduism in Goa
Social groups of Goa
Other Backward Classes
Christianity in Goa